A Tasmanian devil is a Tasmanian marsupial.

Tasmanian Devil may also refer to:

 Tasmanian Devil (Looney Tunes), an animated character
 Tasmanian Devil (DC Comics), a DC Comics superhero
 Tasmania Devils Football Club (VFL), Australian rules football team that competed in the Victorian Football League between 2001 and 2008 
 Tasmania Devils (NAB League), Australian rules football team that has competed in the NAB League Boys competition since 2019 and the NAB League Girls competition since 2021
 Tasmanian Devil (NHRA dragracing), Pacers Automotive's NHRA record-setting AA/A roadster from the 1960s
 Tasmanian Devils (film), a 2013 Syfy television film
 Tazmanian Devil, an upcoming American film starring Abraham Attah
 Troy Polamalu, a former professional American football player

See also
 Hobart Devils or Hobart Tassie Devils, a defunct Australian National Basketball League team